The second Fraser ministry (Liberal–National Country coalition) was the 51st ministry of the Government of Australia. It was led by the country's 22nd Prime Minister, Malcolm Fraser. The second Fraser ministry succeeded the first Fraser ministry, which dissolved on 22 December 1975 following the federal election that took place on 13 December. The ministry was replaced by the third Fraser ministry on 20 December 1977 following the 1977 federal election.

As of 26 January 2023, Ian Sinclair and Peter Nixon are the last surviving members of the Cabinet of the second Fraser ministry. Tony Street was the last surviving Liberal cabinet member.

Cabinet

Outer ministry

See also
 First Fraser ministry
 Third Fraser ministry
 Fourth Fraser ministry

Notes

Ministries of Elizabeth II
1975 establishments in Australia
1977 disestablishments in Australia
Fraser, 2
Cabinets established in 1975
Cabinets disestablished in 1977
Ministry, Fraser 2